The North American P-64 was the designation assigned by the United States Army Air Corps (USAAC) to the North American Aviation NA-68 fighter, an upgraded variant of the NA-50 developed during the late 1930s. Seven NA-50s were purchased by the Peruvian Air Force, which nicknamed it Torito ("Little Bull").

Six NA-68s ordered by the Royal Thai Air Force were seized before export by the US government in 1941, after the Franco-Thai War and growing ties between Thailand and the Empire of Japan. These aircraft were used by the USAAC as unarmed fighter trainers.

The Peruvian NA-50s subsequently saw action during the Ecuadorian–Peruvian War of 1941.

Design and development

NA-50

The North American Aviation NA-50 was developed as a simple single-seat, low-wing, single-engined fighter for export. The design was developed from the NA-16/BT-9 basic training aircraft of 1935. The NA-16 evolved into a series of aircraft that were some of the most widely used advanced and basic training aircraft produced by any country, and provided the basic design for a single-engined fighter intended for small countries that needed a simple aircraft with modern capabilities and features.

The NA-50 Torito (Spanish slang for "little bull"), built for Peru, was a single-seat fighter design based on the two-seat Basic Combat Demonstrator NA-44. It was armed with two .30 in (7.62 mm) M1919 Browning machine guns. The aircraft were manufactured in May 1939, and test-flown at the factory.

NA-68
In 1940, the Royal Thai Air Force ordered six aircraft similar to the NA-50 that were designated NA-68. The changes in the NA-68 included a modified landing gear, new outer wings, heavier armament, and redesigned tail surfaces similar to those adopted on later production trainers. North American test pilot Lewis Waite flew the first NA-68 on 1 September 1940.

Operational history

Peru purchased seven aircraft for the Peruvian Air Force, with deliveries completed in May 1939. In Peruvian service, these aircraft were fitted with bomb racks under the fuselage for light bombs. The Peruvian NA-50s took part in the Ecuadorian–Peruvian War of July 1941, supporting Army of Peru ground forces.

In 1940, the NA-68s (along with a parallel order for NA-69 two seaters) ordered by the Royal Thai Air Force were en route to Thailand when their export clearance was cancelled and were returned to the United States where they were assigned the designation P-64, disarmed, and used for advanced fighter training.

Operators
 
 Peruvian Air Force
 
 United States Army Air Corps/United States Army Air Forces

Surviving aircraft

 NA-50 XXI-41-4 (c/n 50-951). The sole surviving NA-50 is currently under restoration at Las Palmas Air Base, Lima, Peru, with it being planned that the aircraft be restored to flying by 2021. The aircraft remained in service until 1961 and was then displayed on a pedestal next to the Mausoleum of Captain José Quiñones Gonzales, (a Peruvian national hero who died flying an NA-50), until 2018, when it was removed for restoration.
 NA-68A 41-19085 (c/n 68-3061). One of the six intercepted Thailand-bound P-64s which survived being used for training and liaison was obtained by the Experimental Aircraft Association in the 1960s, and was used by EAA founder and president Paul Poberezny to perform an aerobatic display as part of the organization's annual fly-in. It was retired from flight after 1988 and placed on display at the EAA Aviation Museum. This aircraft has been restored to flying condition, with the engine running again in 2013, followed by its first flying appearance  at the 2016 (EAA AirVenture Oshkosh airshow).

Specifications (NA-68/P-64)

See also

References

Notes

Bibliography
 
 Green, William. War Planes of the Second World War - Fighters (Vol 4). London: MacDonald, 1961.

External links

 WEDNESDAY NIGHT AIR SHOW
 P-64 Runs for First Time in Decades
 Airventure Museum: North American P-64/NA-50 – N840
 North American P-64

1940s United States fighter aircraft
P-64
Single-engined tractor aircraft
Low-wing aircraft
Aircraft first flown in 1939